Neural Computation is a monthly peer-reviewed scientific journal covering all aspects of neural computation, including modeling the brain and the design and construction of neurally-inspired information processing systems. It was established in 1989 and is published by MIT Press. The editor-in-chief is Terrence J. Sejnowski (Salk Institute for Biological Studies). According to the Journal Citation Reports, the journal has a 2021 impact factor of 3.278.

References

External links 

Neuroscience journals
MIT Press academic journals
Monthly journals
English-language journals
Publications established in 1989
Cognitive science journals